Abass Cheikh Dieng (born 1 January 1985) is a retired  Senegalese footballer.

Career
Dieng began his career with Ja-Ndar-Toute and signed in summer 2004 for ASC Linguère. After one year with ASC Linguère signed a contract with Saint-Louis Football Center and joined in July 2006 to Budapest Honvéd FC who was in the team that reached the 3rd round of European League in 2009/2010 season. Also among the Budapest Honvéd FC team that won the 2008/2009 Cup of Hungary.

In December 2011, he moved to Vietnam and signed a contract with Sông Lam Nghệ An F.C. He also included in Sông Lam Nghệ An F.C. winning squads for 2011 Vietnamese Super Cup.

From 2014 to 2015, he played for Becamex Bình Dương and helped the team win two consecutive  V.League 1 titles.

Honours

Club
Budapest Honvéd
Hungarian Cup:
Winner: 2006–07, 2008–09
Sông Lam Nghệ An
Vietnamese Super Cup:
Winner: 2011
Becamex Bình Dương
V.League 1:
Winner: 2014, 2015

References
 

1985 births
Living people
Sportspeople from Saint-Louis, Senegal
Senegalese footballers
Senegal international footballers
Senegalese expatriate footballers
Expatriate footballers in France
Expatriate footballers in Hungary
Expatriate footballers in Vietnam
ASC Linguère players
Budapest Honvéd FC players
Nemzeti Bajnokság I players
Nîmes Olympique players
Ligue 2 players
Song Lam Nghe An FC players
Thanh Hóa FC players
Becamex Binh Duong FC players
V.League 1 players
Association football midfielders